Split Lake is a small lake in the north of Northland Region, New Zealand. It is near to the coast of the Tasman Sea and Ahipara Bay.

See also
List of lakes in New Zealand

References

Lakes of the Northland Region
Far North District